In phonetics and phonology, a palatal stop is a type of consonantal sound, made with the body of the tongue in contact with the hard palate (hence palatal), held tightly enough to block the passage of air (hence a stop consonant).   Note that a stop consonant made with the tip of the tongue curled back against the palate is called a retroflex stop.

Palatal stops are less common than velar stops or alveolar stops and do not occur in English.

The term "palatal stop" is sometimes used imprecisely to refer to postalveolar affricates, which themselves come in numerous varieties, or to other acoustically similar sounds, such as palatalized velar stops.

The most common sound is the voiced nasal . More generally, several kinds are distinguished:

 , voiceless palatal plosive
 , voiced palatal plosive
 , voiced palatal nasal
 , voiceless palatal nasal
 , palatal ejective (fairly rare)
 , voiced palatal implosive (fairly rare)
  or  voiceless palatal implosive (very rare)

Palatal consonants
Plosives